The Takht Jamshid Cup (Jâm-e Taxt-e Jamšid) was a national football league based in Iran which lasted from 1973 to 1978.

History

Before 1970
Before 1970s, the tournament was called the Iranian Championship cup, but it was not regular and continuous. Most clubs participated in championships of their city or province. Therefore, the champion of the Tehran Premier League was seen as the Iranian football champion. Due to their achievements in the Tehran Premier League, Shahin Tehran and Taj, today known as Esteghlal, were the most popular teams at this time. Also Daraei and PAS Tehran were successful clubs in the local Tehran Province League.

Takht Jamshid Cup

In 1972, the Takht Jamshid Cup was founded as the national league and included teams from all over the country. The Iranian Football Federation had decided to create a league similar to European football leagues. The league was named after Jamshid, a mythological figure of Greater Iranian culture and tradition. The Takht Jamshid Cup comprised twelve clubs in the 1973–74 season. Persepolis became the first champions of the Takht Jamshid Cup, two points ahead of rival Taj.

Before the beginning of the 1974–75 season, the number of teams were increased from twelve to 16 teams. Esteghlal claimed its first Takht Jamshid Cup title after winning the league ahead of Persepolis. The 1975–76 Takht Jamshid Cup was won by Persepolis with a great performance by Iranian football legend Ali Parvin. The second place team was another Tehran based club, Homa. The next two seasons were won by PAS Tehran under coach Hassan Habibi. PAS Tehran won their championships both times ahead of Persepolis. At this time the Takht Jamshid Cup was one of the strongest football leagues in Asia. The Iran national football team won in 1976 their third successive AFC Asian Cup and qualified 1978 for the FIFA World Cup for the first time in the country's history.

1979 Revolution and 1980s
The 1978–79 Takht Jamshid Cup season was abandoned due to the 1979 Revolution. Shahbaz was leading the league after twelve matchdays ahead of Persepolis and Taj. Due to the Islamic Revolution and the Iran–Iraq War, the Takht Jamshid Cup was dissolved and also the lower leagues were unorganized. Once again the champion of the Tehran Province League was seen as the Iranian football champion.

Takht Jamshid Cup Champions

 
‡ Shahbaz F.C. was league leader when in autumn 1978 the season was canceled.

Total titles

See also
Football in Iran
Iran's Premier Football League

References

External links
 
 

 
Defunct football leagues in Iran
Recurring events disestablished in 1978
Recurring sporting events established in 1973